Aliona Bolsova and Katarzyna Kawa were the defending champions, but chose not to participate.

Dalila Jakupović and Tena Lukas won the title, defeating Olga Danilović and Aleksandra Krunić in the final, 5–7, 6–2, [10–5].

Seeds

Draw

Draw

References

External links
Main Draw

2022 WTA 125 tournaments